David Armstrong VI (born 1968) is a Canadian artist, living and working in Montréal, Canada. His work has been exhibited widely, including shows at White Columns (NY), The Power Plant (Toronto), Musée d'art Contemporain de Montréal, Kunsthal Nikolaj (Copenhagen), Night Gallery (LA), and the National Gallery of Canada (Ottawa). He is represented by Bradley Ertaskirin in Montreal, Quebec, Canada.

Life and education
David Armstrong VI (b.1968, Belleville Ontario) studied Fine Arts at Queen's University in Kingston, Ontario (BFA 1987–1991). He lived in Toronto from 1993 to 2005, and has been working in Montréal since 2006. The Conseil des arts et lettres du Québec awarded Armstrong VI residency scholarships at Kunstlerhaus Bethanien in Berlin (2012) and the Rome International Studio (2017). He was also invited as artist in residence at AIRAntwerpen in 2015.

Work
Armstrong Six' work draws upon a wide range of references and materials, resulting in a practice encompassing sculpture, drawing and video. Whether it be the use of fluorescent light fixtures to articulate a minimalist form, leaking liquids from a false ceiling onto a gallery floor, or the unruly and humorously vitriolic performance of an original rap song, one may see in his body of work as a strategy for infecting culture through the tenuous nature of its prototypes.

Armstrong Six's first solo exhibition, Depth Sounding, in Toronto (1996) was a pivotal point in the beginning of his artistic career. 
The artist has since participated in numerous exhibitions including Leak into Space at Mercer Union, Toronto (2000), Dog Leg Room at blanche, Paris (2001), The Cave and the Island at Galerie Kunstbuero, Vienna and White Columns, New York (2004), Teorias de Resistencia at la Casa Encendida, Madrid (2004), I Wanna Be a Popstar at Loop-raum fur aktuelle kunst, Berlin (2004), If Not for Today, Tomorrow at State Projects, New York (2005), Rien ne se perd, rien ne se crée, tout se transforme at the Musée d'art contemporain de Montréal (2008), Two Flies Later at Hunter & Cook, Toronto (2009), The Dry Salvages at Parisian Laundry, Montreal (2010), La Biennale de Montréal (2011), Civil Elegies From the Vacuum State at Künstlerhaus Bethanien, Berlin (2012), Brown Star Plus One at Parisian Laundry, Montreal (2013), Three Known Points at the Museum of Contemporary Canadian Art, Toronto (2013) and International Women's Day at Night Gallery, Los Angeles (2014).

His work has been exhibited widely throughout Canada, the US, Europe and New Zealand and is included in various collections including the Art Gallery of Ontario, the Musée national des beaux-arts du Québec, and the Musée d'art contemporain de Montréal.

References

Prizes 
Conseil des arts et des letters du Québec, 2010	
Canada Council for the Arts, 2009
Canada Council for the Arts, 2002
Toronto Arts Council, 2001
Ontario Arts Council, 2001

External links 
 Review in Frieze Magazine
Review Andrea Carson, Sculpture speaks Volumes’’ View on Canadian Art, 05|21|10
Désordre Monumental
No refunds on absurdity
David Armstrong Six at Parisian Laundry

1968 births
Living people
Canadian multimedia artists
Canadian installation artists
Canadian performance artists
Artists from Montreal
Artists from Toronto